This is a list of flying aces in World War II from Ireland.  For other countries see List of World War II aces by country.

Brendan Eamonn Fergus Finucane RAF No.13 No.65 & No.602 Sqn, Hornchurch Wing; RCAF No.19 & No.452 Sqn; KIA 15/Jul/1942
John Martin Bruen FAA 5 801, 759, 803, 778, 800 & 836Sq
John Ignatus Kilmartin RAF 12.33 1, 43, 602, 313, 128 & 504Sq, Hornchurch Wing, 136 Wing, 910 Wing
James Reginald Bryan Meaker RAF 8 46, 263 & 249Sq; KIA 27/Sep/1940
Rupert Frederick Smythe RAF 6 29, 504 & 32Sq
Robert Wilkinson Turkington RAF 9.16 124, 611, 43, 72, 241 & 601Sq; KIFA Apr/1945

Notes and references

Ireland